Thomas Hotham DD (also de Hotham, Hothum, Hodham, and Hothun) was an English medieval university chancellor.

Hotham was a Doctor of Divinity at the University of Oxford. From 1326 to 1328, he was Chancellor of the University.

References

Year of birth unknown
Year of death unknown
Chancellors of the University of Oxford
13th-century English people
14th-century English people